Paterson is a Scottish given name meaning "son of Patrick".  It is more commonly used as a surname.  People with the given name Paterson include:

 Paterson Ewen (1925 - 2002), Canadian painter
 Paterson Joseph (born 1964), British actor
 T. Paterson Ross (died 1957), American architect

See also
 Paterson (surname)

Masculine given names
Scottish given names